Edward Crane may refer to:
 Ed Crane (baseball) (1862–1896), American right-handed pitcher and outfielder in Major League Baseball
 Ed Crane (journalist), reporter for CBS News
 Ed Crane (politician) (born 1944), founder of the Cato Institute
 Eddie Crane, fictional canine character on sitcom Frasier